Selwyn John "Sel" Muller (18 October 1917 – 24 February 2008) was a dairy farmer and member of the Queensland Legislative Assembly.

Biography
Muller was born in Boonah, Queensland, to parents Adolf Gustav Muller and his wife Annie (née Lobegeiger) and attended Kalbar State School and Boonah High School. He became a farmer and grazier in the Boonah district. In World War Two he was assigned to the 7 Division Cavalry Regiment reaching the rank of Lieutenant.

On 14 August 1950 Muller married Patricia Margaret O'Callaghan (died 1988) and together had one son and one daughter. He died in February 2008 and was buried in Kalbar General Cemetery.

Political career
Muller represented the state seat of Fassifern from 1969 until 1983, taking over the seat from his father, Alf Muller. He was the Speaker from 1979 until 1983.

References

Members of the Queensland Legislative Assembly
1917 births
2008 deaths
20th-century Australian politicians